Demon Kiss is the fourth studio album of Blutengel.

Track listing

Info
 All tracks written and produced by Christian "Chris" Pohl
 Male vocals by Chris Pohl
 Female vocals on "Angels Of The Dark", "Silent Tears(For You)", "In The Distance" and "Go To Hell?" by Eva Pölzing and Constance Rudert
 Female vocals on "Love Killer", "Stay", "Ice Angel" and solo on "Frozen Heart" by Constance Rudert
 Solo female vocals on "Senseless Life" and "Falscher Stolz" by Eva Pölzing
 Recorded at Fear Section Studio during 2003/2004
 Album cover and photography by Constance Rudert and Annie Bertram

2004 albums
Blutengel albums